Draba muralis is a species of flowering plant known as wall whitlowgrass. It is in the mustard family, Brassicaceae. Draba muralis is native to Europe and Central Asia.

References

muralis
Flora of Europe
Flora of Asia